Testament Records may refer to:

 Testament Records (UK), a classical music record label
 Testament Records (USA), an American roots music record label